The Gotham Independent Film Award for Best Feature is one of the annual Gotham Independent Film Awards and was first awarded in 2004 with Alexander Payne's Sideways  being the first recipient of the award.

Winners and nominees

2000s

2010s

2020s

See also
 Academy Award for Best Picture
 Independent Spirit Award for Best Film

References

External links
Official website

Best Feature
Awards for best film